10 Rules for Sleeping Around is a 2013 American screwball romantic sex comedy film written, produced, and directed by Leslie Greif and starring Jesse Bradford, Chris Marquette, Tammin Sursok, Virginia Williams and Reid Ewing.

Synopsis
The film is about two couples whose sexual escapades land them in a tangle of lies. By following ten simple rules, 20-somethings Vince and Cameron spice up their relationship by sleeping around. But when their straitlaced friends get engaged, their relationship gets turned upside down. To put the rules to the test, they will go on the road to the Hamptons to crash the biggest party of the year where love triangles collide and off-the-wall mayhem ensues.

Cast

 Jesse Bradford as Vince Johnson
 Chris Marquette as Ben Roberts
 Tammin Sursok as Kate Oliver
 Virginia Williams as Cameron Johnson
 Bryan Callen as Owen Manners
 Lucia Sola as Gabriella "Gabi" Jobim
 Wendi McLendon-Covey as Emma Cooney
 Michael McKean as Jeffrey Fields
 Reid Ewing as Hugh Fields
 Simone Griffeth as Barbara
 Corey Saunders as Matt
 Bill Bellamy as Dwayne
 Mills Allison as Duncan
 Zakiya Alta Lee as Tanisha
 Jamie Renee Smith as Nikki
 Molly McCook as Jaymee
 Leslie Greif as Foreman Joe
 Michael Corbett as himself

Release
10 Rules for Sleeping Around was first released via DVD in the Netherlands on August 13, 2013, before arriving in the United States, on April 4, 2014.

Critical reception
On Rotten Tomatoes, the film has a 0% rating based on reviews from 8 critics. On Metacritic it has a score of 1 out of 100 based on reviews from 5 critics, indicating "overwhelming dislike". It is one of ten films to hold this rating of 1; the other nine being Bio-Dome, Chaos, inAPPropriate Comedy, Not Cool, The Singing Forest, The Garbage Pail Kids Movie, Death of a Nation, Hardbodies, and United Passions.

John DeFore of The Hollywood Reporter calls the film "a numbingly unfunny sex farce." 1NFLUX Magazines review was slightly more positive, giving the film a C+.

References

External links
 
 
 
 

2013 films
2013 independent films
2013 romantic comedy films
2010s sex comedy films
American independent films
American romantic comedy films
American sex comedy films
Casual sex in films
2010s English-language films
Films set in New York City
Films shot in New York City
Films shot in North Carolina
2010s American films